Tiffany Reisz is an American author. She is best known for the Original Sinners series of erotica and she has won the RITA Award and a Lambda Literary Award.

Reisz is best known for writing the Original Sinners series, published by Harlequin imprint Mira Books. Called "smart smut" by NPR and "Fifty Shades for adults" by Salon, Reisz's work is known for its witty depictions of sex and heavy use of religious imagery and themes. In 2014, USA Today championed Reisz for her diverse characters.

Reisz is Catholic and attended Asbury Theological Seminary and Centre College. She lives in Louisville, Kentucky with her husband, novelist Andrew Shaffer.


Publications

The Original Sinners series 
The Original Sinners series comprises nine full-length, erotica novels:
 The Siren
 The Angel
 The Prince
 The Mistress
 The Saint - RITA Award winner for erotic romance
 The King - Lambda Literary Award winner (gay erotica category)
 The Virgin
 The Queen
 The Priest

The series also includes 14 stand-alone, "series adjacent" novellas; a prequel; and four collection anthologies, including RITA Award finalist Picture Perfect Cowboy.

Additional works 
Other works by Reisz include:
 The Godwicks romance novel series
 The Red - An NPR Best Book of the Year
 The Rose
 The Pearl
 The Beguiling of Merlin
 The Men at Work series, published by Harlequin Blaze
 Her Halloween Treat
 Her Naughty Holiday
 Ian's Forbidden Dream Girl
 One Hot December - Romance Times Reviewers' Choice Award for Best Series Romance
 Two erotica novellas published as part of the Cosmo Red Hot Reads project
 Misbehaving
 Seize the Night
 Four gothic stand-alone romance novels
 The Bourbon Thief
 The Headmaster - RITA Award finalist for contemporary romance
 The Lucky Ones
 The Night Mark - RITA Award finalist for mainstream fiction with a central romance

References 

Living people
Year of birth missing (living people)
21st-century American women writers
21st-century American novelists
American women novelists
American erotica writers
Writers from Kentucky